Appallagoda is a village in Sri Lanka. It is located within Central Province.

See also
 List of towns in Central Province, Sri Lanka
 Appallagoda Ambalama

External links

Populated places in Kandy District